Lawrence Paul Zatkoff (June 16, 1939 – January 22, 2015) was a United States district judge of the United States District Court for the Eastern District of Michigan.

Education and career

Born in Detroit, Michigan, Zatkoff received a Bachelor of Science from the University of Detroit (now University of Detroit Mercy) in 1962 and a Juris Doctor from Detroit College of Law (now Michigan State University College of Law) in 1966. He was an assistant prosecuting attorney of Macomb County, Michigan in 1966. He was in private practice in Detroit, Michigan from 1966 to 1968, and in Roseville, Michigan from 1968 to 1978, also serving as a member of the faculty of Detroit College of Law from 1968 to 1969, and as an associate government appeal agent for the Selective Service Administration from 1969 to 1972. He was a judge on the Macomb County Probate Court from 1978 to 1982, and on the Macomb County Circuit Court from 1982 to 1986.

Federal judicial service

On January 21, 1986, Zatkoff was nominated by President Ronald Reagan to a seat on the United States District Court for the Eastern District of Michigan vacated by Judge Ralph B. Guy Jr. Zatkoff was confirmed by the United States Senate on March 3, 1986, and received his commission on March 4, 1986. He served as Chief Judge from 1999 to 2004, assuming senior status on June 16, 2004. Zatkoff died of cancer on January 22, 2015, in St. Clair Shores, Michigan.

References

Sources
 

1939 births
2015 deaths
Michigan state court judges
Judges of the United States District Court for the Eastern District of Michigan
United States district court judges appointed by Ronald Reagan
20th-century American judges
Lawyers from Detroit
University of Detroit Mercy alumni
Detroit College of Law alumni
Detroit College of Law faculty
People from Roseville, Michigan